Hullabaloo in the Guava Orchard is a novel by Kiran Desai published in 1998. It is her first book and won the top prize for the Betty Trask Awards in 1998. It is set in the Indian village of Shahkot (state of Punjab) and follows the exploits of a young man, Sampath Chawla, trying to avoid the responsibilities of adult life. Fed up with his life in Shahkot, Sampath goes to a guava orchard and settles himself in a guava tree, where he uses the gossip he learned while working at the post office to convince people he is clairvoyant and soon becomes a popular "holy man".

Kiran Desai based this book on a real-life story in which a man, Kapila Pradhan, lived up a tree for 15 years. This was the author's inspiration for the book and there are similarities between the novel and Pradhan's life in his tree.

References

External links 
 Review by NY Times

Novels by Kiran Desai
1998 American novels
Novels set in India
English-language novels
1998 Indian novels
1998 debut novels